Matica - Association of Croatian Unions is the third largest trade union association in Croatia. Founded as Association of Croatian Public Sector Unions in 1993, Matica gathers trade unions from education, health care, graphical industry, services, and social welfare.

External links
www.matica-sindikata.hr

References

Trade unions in Croatia
Trade unions established in 1993
1993 establishments in Croatia
Public sector trade unions